†Libera tumuloides was a species of small air-breathing land snail, a terrestrial pulmonate gastropod mollusc in the family Endodontidae.

This species was endemic to the Cook Islands. It is now extinct.

References

Endodontidae
Extinct gastropods
Gastropods described in 1872
Taxonomy articles created by Polbot